The Arizona Kid is a 1939 American Western film directed by Joseph Kane under the Republic Pictures banner. The film stars Roy Rogers as a Confederate officer in Missouri during the American Civil War.

Plot
Roy and Gabby are Confederate scouts in Missouri during the American Civil War. Val McBride is a Confederate guerilla officer, who doesn’t play by the rules. When Roy first rides into town, he encounters an old childhood friend, Dave Allen. Dave tells Roy that he has joined McBride’s guerilla force and Roy is not pleased. He tells Dave that McBride is not a man to be admired but Dave doesn’t listen.

McBride arrives at the saloon where Dave and Roy are talking and Roy and McBride nearly end up in a fight. The arrival of Union scouts prevents the fight as McBride and his force, including Dave, ride away. Shortly afterwards, McBride is told by his superior Confederate officer that he must play by the rules or be stripped of his command. McBride, furious that his effective (if crude and ungentlemanly) fighting is being scorned, leaves the Confederates and continues to fight both sides on his own.

Roy and Gabby are soon assigned to tracking down and killing McBride and his men. During a brief pause in their search, Roy, Gabby, and the men they have recruited agree to take a small shipment of gold through to another Confederate officer. En route, McBride attacks. Gabby is hurt, though not seriously, while Roy is nearly killed. Dave (still one of McBride’s men) hangs back and helps Gabby get Roy to a nearby cabin for help. Then he leaves to rejoin McBride.

Roy and Gabby set out to resume their search a few months later. After a long and dangerous search, Roy and Gabby find and corner McBride’s men including Dave, but McBride escapes. While Gabby takes care of business, Roy chases McBride to a local saloon and boarding house where the matron hides McBride and refuses to tell Roy where he is. McBride comes out and takes a shot at Roy but misses and Roy returns fire, killing McBride.

Cast
Roy Rogers as Roy Rogers 
George "Gabby" Hayes as "Gabby" Whittaker 
Sally March as Laura Radford 
Stuart Hamblen as Val McBride 
Dorothy Sebastian as Bess Warren 
Robert Middlemass as General Stark 
Earl Dwire as Dr. Jason Radford 
David Kerwin as Dave Allen 
Peter Fargo as Henchman Sheldon 
Fred Burns as Melton – Volunteer
Lisa Ann as Mother of Roy Rogers

External links

 
 
 

1939 films
1930s historical films
1939 Western (genre) films
American black-and-white films
Republic Pictures films
Films directed by Joseph Kane
American Civil War films
American historical films
American Western (genre) films
Films set in Missouri
1930s English-language films
1930s American films